Tales of Adventure may refer to:

 Tales of Adventure (TV series), a 1952-53 Canadian television series
 Tales of Adventure, an album by Breeding Ground (band)

See also
 Adventure Tales